Dr. Madhumati On Duty (formerly Dr. Bhanumati On Duty) is an Indian Hindi hospital based drama television series, which was premiered on 1 August 2016 and broadcast on SAB TV. The series was produced by Optimystix Entertainment owned by Vipul D Shah and it is aired on weekdays. The show was the second season of its previous show Dr. Bhanumati On Duty. The show was re launched as Kavita Kaushik announced on social media that she will be leaving the show, the show went off air. From 1 August, the show was relaunched as Dr. Madhumati On Duty. Kaushik left the show due to her character not developing, and the show being very similar to her previous show, F.I.R., and most dialogues were copied. She got replaced by Debina Bonnerjee.

The re-launched show was introduced with a love angle, as Madhumati serves as Mohan's love interest. The Dean of the hospital was introduced. Unlike Bhanumati (who used drama), Madhumati is strict and cures patients in stereotypical doctor way, while Mohan tries to cure them with laughter and emotions.

Series overview

Cast
Kavita Kaushik as Dr. Bhanumati
Debina Bonnerjee as Dr. Madhumati
Vipul Roy as Dr. Mohan
Anang Desai as Dean
Gopi Bhalla as Lovely Singh Dhingra
Manju Sharma
Oindrila Sahaq
Ketan Singh as Doodhnath
Tapasya Nayak Srivastava as Sonia Jr. Doctor
Prajakta Dusane as Sharmili
Rahul Singh as Bhola
Rahul Sharma
Urmila tiwari as Dr.Priya, Dr.Mohan and Dr.Madhumati's friend
Reshmi Ghosh as Chanda Chauhan
Monica Castelino
Smita Singh
Shakeel Siddiqui
Shiv Panditt as Inspector Makkhan Singh/ Shiv
Jhumma Mitra as Dr Madhumati's Mausi

Broadcast
Dr. Bhanumati On Duty premiered on 7 June 2016. Kavita Kaushik played the lead role at the start of the first series. She played a doctor who is known for her unique style in curing her patients.

As Kaushik announced on social media that she would be leaving the show, the show went off air. Kaushik left the show due to her character not developing, and the show being very similar to her previous show, F.I.R., and most dialogues were copied.

References

2016 Indian television series debuts
2016 Indian television series endings
Hindi-language television shows
Indian comedy television series
Television shows set in Mumbai
Sony SAB original programming
Television series by Optimystix Entertainment